The 2019 Rugby Europe Championship is the premier rugby union competition outside of the Six Nations Championship in Europe. This is the third season under its new format, that sees Georgia, Germany, Russia, Spain, Belgium and Romania compete for the title. After the eligibility controversy of the 2018 Championship, Romania had to face Portugal for the promotion- / relegation- play-off and defeated them, hence joining the competition as the sixth contender.

Table

Fixtures

Week 1

Week 2

Week 3

Week 4

Week 5

Relegation/promotion play-off

See also
 Rugby Europe International Championships
 2018–19 Rugby Europe International Championships
 Six Nations Championship
 Antim Cup

References

External links
 Rugby Europe official website

2018-19
2018–19 Rugby Europe International Championships
2018–19 in Belgian rugby union
2018–19 in Spanish rugby union
2018–19 in German rugby union
2019 in Russian rugby union
2019 in Georgian sport
2018–19 in Romanian rugby union
Rugby Europe
Rugby Europe